Louise Harel (born April 22, 1946) is a Quebec politician. In 2005 she served as interim leader of the Parti Québécois following the resignation of Bernard Landry. She was also interim leader of the opposition in the National Assembly of Quebec. She represented the riding of Hochelaga-Maisonneuve in the Montreal region, and its predecessors, from 1981 to 2008. She ran for Mayor of Montreal as the representative of the Vision Montreal municipal political party in the 2009 election, but was defeated by incumbent Gérald Tremblay. In the 2013 Montreal election, Harel supported federalist Marcel Côté for mayor but failed to be elected to her own council seat.

Life and career
Harel was born in Sainte-Thérèse-de-Blainville, Quebec. She graduated in 1977 from the Université de Montréal with a law degree and was admitted to the bar in 1978. She worked at the national secretariat, the Centre des services sociaux de Montréal and the Social Development Council of Metropolitan Montreal as a staff member. She has been a member of the Parti Québécois (PQ) since 1970 and was the president of the party in Montreal-Centre in the  1970s and the vice-president of the party province wide from 1979 to 1981.

She was first elected to the National Assembly in the 1981 election as the Member of the National Assembly (MNA) for Maisonneuve. In 1984, she was appointed Minister of Cultural Communities and Immigration by Quebec Premier René Lévesque, and served until the government's electoral defeat in the 1985 election. She retained her seat that year and in 1989 (when it was renamed Hochelaga-Maisonneuve), however, and served in opposition for the next five years.

When the PQ returned to power in the 1994 election under the leadership of Jacques Parizeau, she returned to cabinet as Minister of Employment and minister responsible for immigration.

After being re-elected in 1998, she later served as Minister of Municipal Affairs. During her tenure as minister, she tabled a bill which forced the merger of several small municipalities into one entity and affected all key cities such as Gatineau, Montreal, Quebec City, Trois-Rivières, Saguenay, Longueuil and Sherbrooke. The project, which was implemented in 2002 was met with mixed reviews and later become a key issue during the 2003 provincial elections.

In 2002, she became the first woman to serve as Speaker of the National Assembly, and remained in that capacity until the 2003 election, after which she joined the PQ on the opposition benches.

Harel served as interim PQ leader and leader of the opposition until a leadership election chose André Boisclair as leader on November 15, 2005. She was not a candidate in the leadership election. She continued to serve as leader of the opposition until PQ leader André Boisclair won his seat in the National Assembly on August 14, 2006.

She was re-elected in the 2007 elections and named the PQ critic in social services and later she was also giving the portfolio of Status of Women. In October 2008, she announced that she would not seek another mandate.

Montreal mayoralty campaign 2009
Harel ran for mayor of Montreal for the November 1, 2009 Montreal municipal election on behalf of the municipal Vision Montréal party.  To that end, she studied to improve her poor English, a liability in a city where almost 20% the population is Anglophone. She has stated that the rise of "ethnic neighbourhoods" in the city is an undesirable situation, because she believes that Montrealers should feel part of the whole city, not just of their own borough. A central aspect of her campaign has been to centralize municipal government.

She came in second in the mayoralty race, and became city councillor for the district of Maisonneuve–Longue-Pointe. She announced she would remain leader of Vision Montréal and opposition leader at City Hall.

Montreal municipal election 2013
In early July 2013, Harel allied Vision Montreal with mayoral hopeful Marcel Côté.  She opted against another mayoral run in her own right after recognizing that given her massive unpopularity among anglophones it was impossible for her to become mayor.

After her own district was abolished, Harel ran for councillor in Sainte-Marie, the eastern section of Ville-Marie, but lost to Projet Montreal's Valérie Plante. Côté came a distant fourth in the mayoral race at the head of a new party called Coalition Montréal Marcel Côté.

In January 2014 Harel announced her intention to revive Vision Montreal but not to run for office again herself. She has also begun a weekly broadcast on Radio Ville-Marie.

Electoral record

See also
 Parti Québécois Crisis, 1984

References

External links
 

1946 births
Women municipal councillors in Canada
Female Canadian political party leaders
French Quebecers
Living people
People from Mercier–Hochelaga-Maisonneuve
Montreal city councillors
Parti Québécois MNAs
People from Sainte-Thérèse, Quebec
Presidents of the National Assembly of Quebec
Université de Montréal alumni
Women MNAs in Quebec
Leaders of the Parti Québécois
21st-century Canadian politicians
21st-century Canadian women politicians
Women legislative speakers